Apostolepis longicaudata, the Piauí blackhead or longhead burrowing snake, is a species of snake in the family Colubridae. It is endemic to Brazil.

References 

longicaudata
Reptiles described in 1921
Reptiles of Brazil